Cookies is the first album from the Scottish indie rock band 1990s. This album was number 23 on Rolling Stones list of the Top 50 Albums of 2007.  "Situation" was number 36 on Rolling Stones list of the 100 Best Songs of 2007.

Track listing 

 "You Made Me Like It" (Michael McGaughrin, Jackie McKeown) - 3:10
 "See You at the Lights" (Michael McGaughrin, Jackie McKeown) - 2:55
 "Cult Status" (Jackie McKeown) - 2:56
 "Arcade Precinct" (Michael McGaughrin, Jackie McKeown) - 3:13
 "Is There a Switch for That?" (Michael McGaughrin, Jackie McKeown) - 2:09
 "Enjoying Myself" (Michael McGaughrin, Jackie McKeown) - 2:28
 "You're Supposed to Be My Friend" (Jackie McKeown) - 3:38
 "Pollokshields" (Jackie McKeown) - 2:24
 "Risque Pictures" (Michael McGaughrin, Jackie McKeown, Jamie McMorrow) - 3:12
 "Weed" (Jackie McKeown) - 3:26
 "Thinking of Not Going" (Jackie McKeown) - 2:02
 "Situation" (Jackie McKeown) - 5:07

Singles 
 "You Made Me Like It" (2006)
 "You're Supposed to Be My Friend" (2006)
 "See You at the Lights" (2007)

Music videos 
 "You Made Me Like It" (2006)
 "You're Supposed to Be My Friend" (2006)
 "See You at the Lights" (2007)
 "You Made Me Like It (Re-release) (2007)

Reception 
Eric Harvey of Pitchfork gave Cookies a rating of 8.1 out of 10. He stated the record was the sound of, "a reveler reinvigorated, shoved into a decidedly larger public eye and loving every minute of it in his own way." He also stated that the record was devoted to "having fun at all costs." Stephanie Butler of PopMatters wrote that Cookies, "Sounds like these guys have been playing in crowded bars for gyrating, drunken art students for years. And that’s a very good thing."

References

External links 
 1990s Official website
 One of the first playings of the song in America

2007 debut albums
1990s (band) albums
Albums produced by Bernard Butler
Rough Trade Records albums